Terence is a male given name, derived from the Latin name Terentius. The diminutive form is Terry. Spelling variants include Terrence, Terrance, Terance and (in Scotland) Torrance.

Notable people with this name 
 Terence (c. 195/185 - c. 159 BC), Latin playwright
 Saint Terence, several people
 Geezer Butler (born Terence Butler in 1949), British musician of Black Sabbath fame
 Terry Callier (1945–2012), American jazz and folk singer and guitarist
 Terence Chang, Hong Kong and American film producer
 Terry Crews, American actor and TV presenter
 Terence Trent D'Arby (b. 1962), R&B musician
 Terry A. Davis (1969 -2018), developer of TempleOS
 Terence Dials (b. 1983), American basketball player
 Terry Fox (1958-1981), Canadian athlete, humanitarian, and cancer research activist
 Terence Garvin (b. 1991), American football player
 Terrence Giddy, known as Terry Giddy (born 1950), Australian Paralympic athlete
 Torry Gillick (1915-1971), Scottish footballer
 Terence Hill, Italian actor
 Terrence Howard, American actor and singer
 Terrence Hughes, American professional wrestler
 Terrence Jenkins, American actor, TV personality, and model
 Terence Kelly, many people
 Terence Lam (born 1991), Hong Kong composer, singer-songwriter, and record producer
 Terrence Magee, American football player
 Terrence Malick, American filmmaker
 Terence MacSwiney (1879–1920), Lord Mayor of Cork who died on hunger strike during the Irish War of Independence
 Terry McAuliffe, American politician and businessman
 Terence McKenna, American writer and philosopher
 Terence McKenna, Canadian film producer
 Terence Millin (1903–1980), Irish surgeon
 Terence Morris (born 1979) NBA and Israel Basketball Premier League basketball player
 Terence Newman, American football player
 Terence O'Neill, Ulster Unionist politician, Prime Minister of Northern Ireland
 Terence Parkin, deaf South African swimmer and the most decorated Deaflympic athlete in history
 Terry Pratchett, English author
 Terence Rattigan, British dramatist
 Terrence Romeo (born 1992), Filipino basketball player
 Terence Sanders (1901–1985), British rower
 Terence Siufay (born 1976), Macanese singer and actor
 Terence Smith, many people
 Terence Stamp, British actor
 Terence Steele (born 1997), American football player
 Terence Tao, Australian mathematician winner of a Fields Medal
 Terrence Trammell (born 1978), American track and field athlete
 Terence Tse, educator, speaker, advisor and commentator
 Terrence Watson (born 1987), American-Israeli basketball player
 Terrence Wilcutt, American astronaut
 Terence Winter, American television and film writer
 Terence Wilson, also known as Astro, former British singer and member of British bandUB40
 Terence Yin (born 1975), Hong Kong film actor, singer, producer, and media relations specialist
 Terence Young (director), British film director
 Terence Young (politician) (b. 1952), Canadian politician
 Terence Yung, classical pianist

Fictional characters 
 Terence or Terrence (Terry) Granchester (or Grandchester), male character in Candy Candy (manga, anime and Final Story)
 Terence the Tractor in The Railway Series and Thomas and Friends
 Terence, the large red bird from the Angry Birds video game series
 Terence, a pixie dust sparrow-man from Disney Fairies
 Terence, a bath toy crocodile in Rubbadubbers
 Terence (Terry) Morris, a character in the X-Files TV series, episodes "Dreamland" and "Dreamland II"
 Terrance and Phillip, a duo of characters in the animated TV series, South Park
 Terrence (Terry) McGinnis, the main character of Batman Beyond
 Terrence, Mac's older brother, in Foster's Home for Imaginary Friends

See also 
 
 
Terance, given name
Terrance, given name

References 

English masculine given names

it:Terenzio (nome)
pl:Terencjusz (imię)
ru:Терентий